This is a list of drama films of the 1940s.

1940
 Brigham Young
 The Grapes of Wrath
 The Great Dictator
 Kitty Foyle
 Knute Rockne, All American
 Lillian Russell
 Rebecca
 The Letter

1941
 Citizen Kane
 Here Comes Mr. Jordan
 How Green Was My Valley
 Meet John Doe
 Men of Boys Town
 Sergeant York
 Suspicion
 The Little Foxes

1942
 Bambi
 Casablanca
 Joan of Paris
 The Magnificent Ambersons
 Mrs. Miniver
 The Pied Piper
 Pride of the Yankees
 Random Harvest

1943
 Day of Wrath
 For Whom the Bell Tolls
 Jane Eyre
 Life and Death of Colonel Blimp
 So Proudly We Hail!
 Song of Bernadette
 Watch on the Rhine

1944
 The Children Are Watching Us
 Going My Way
 Lifeboat
 Mr. Skeffington
 Passage to Marseilles
 Secret Command
 Since You Went Away
 Till We Meet Again
 To Have and Have Not
 Wilson

1945
 The Bells of St. Mary's
 Brief Encounter
 Children of Paradise
 Corn Is Green
 I Know Where I'm Going!
 Leave Her to Heaven
 Lost Weekend
 Mildred Pierce
 Rome Open City
 The Southerner
 A Tree Grows in Brooklyn
 Week-End at the Waldorf

1946
 The Best Years of Our Lives
 Dragonwyck
 Gilda
 Great Expectations
 Humoresque
 It's a Wonderful Life
 Minshū no Teki
 No Regrets for Our Youth
 Paisà
 Utamaro and His Five Women

1947
 The Bishop's Wife
 Black Narcissus
 A Double Life
 Gentleman's Agreement
 Miracle on 34th Street
 Mourning Becomes Electra
 Sea of Grass
 Shoeshine

1948
 Another Part of the Forest
 Bicycle Thieves
 Corridor of Mirrors
 Drunken Angel
 The Fallen Idol
 Germany Year Zero
 Hamlet
 I Remember Mama
 Johnny Belinda
 Letter from an Unknown Woman
 Oliver Twist
 The Red Shoes
 The Snake Pit
 State of the Union

1949
 All the King's Men
 The Blue Lagoon
 Daleká cesta
 Federal Agents vs. Underworld, Inc.
 The File on Thelma Jordon
 The Heiress
 Intruder in the Dust
 Late Spring
 My Foolish Heart
 Ostani Etap
 They Live by Night
 Under Capricorn

References

Drama
1940s